Peter B. Bach is a physician and writer at Memorial Sloan-Kettering Cancer Center where he is Director of the Center for Health Policy and Outcomes.  His research focuses on healthcare policy, particularly as it relates to Medicare, racial disparities in cancer care quality, and lung cancer.  Along with his scientific writings he is a frequent contributor to The New York Times and other newspapers.

Career and education
Bach chronicled his wife Ruth’s treatment for early breast cancer in a series of articles of blog posts for the New York Times, and then wrote about her death from the disease in a piece for New York Magazine. Bach discussed the article on Leonard Lopate's former show on WNYC.

In 2012, Bach, who is a frequent critic of pharmaceutical pricing in cancer, co-authored an opinion piece in his New York Times blog outlining Memorial Sloan Kettering’s decision not to offer a new cancer drug, Zaltrap, to its patients due to the drug's price. At the time, the price for Zaltrap was more than twice as high than another cancer drug already being used by the hospital to treat colorectal cancer with similar efficacy. The New York Times piece by Bach was discussed in a 60 Minutes segment highlighting the rising cost of cancer drugs. Bach was seen as influential in the eventual lowering of Zaltrap's price by the manufacturer, Sanofi.

In 2015, Bach released DrugAbacus, billed as an interactive tool that users can apply to model prices for cancer drugs based on a number of factors, including clinical efficacy, safety and toxicity, the value placed on a year of life, and the value of innovation. The tool then allows users to compare the generated values with existing drug prices. Additionally, Bach co-authored a paper published in the American Medical Association in which he described possible value-based drug pricing approaches in the United States.

Bach has also worked on areas related to racial disparities within the provision of cancer care. Along with research collaborators, he has published evidence that black Medicare beneficiaries with lung cancer do not receive as high quality care as white patients. A paper in 2007 demonstrated that care in Medicare is highly fragmented, with the average beneficiary seeing multiple primary care physicians and specialists. He has worked on developing lung cancer screening guidelines also developed a lung cancer risk prediction model.  He has proposed a number of strategies by which Medicare could link payment level to the value of healthcare delivered.

His lay press contributions have included op-eds on topics such as medical school tuition funding, setting physician reimbursement based on market forces, and why cancer screening recommendations are often not followed.
 
Bach earned a bachelor's degree in English and American Literature from Harvard University (1986), a MD from the University of Minnesota (1992) and a Masters of Arts in Public Policy (1997) from the University of Chicago.  He obtained his internal medicine training at Johns Hopkins Hospital, and completed a fellowship in Pulmonary and Critical Care Medicine at the University of Chicago and Johns Hopkins Hospital.

Other positions
The Centers for Medicare and Medicaid Services (Senior Advisor to the Administrator: 2005-2006)
National Cancer Policy Forum of the Institute of Medicine (Member: 2005-current)
Working group on HIT for the President’s Council of Advisors on Science and Technology (PCAST) (2009-2011)
Institute of Medicine Committee on Geographic Variation in Healthcare Spending (Member: 2010-current)
The World Economic Forum's Global Agenda Council on Health Technology (2012-current)

References

External links
Profile at Memorial Sloan-Kettering Cancer Center Department of Epidemiology and Biostatistics
Open Mind TV Show, PBS, 4/12/21. Interview with Richard Heffner, "Do We "Waste" Money on Terminal Patients?"
Open Mind TV Show, PBS, 4/12/28. Interview with Richard Heffner, "Do We "Waste" Money on Terminal Patients?" (part 2)

1964 births
Living people
American medical researchers
Cancer researchers
Harvard College alumni
University of Chicago Harris School of Public Policy alumni
University of Minnesota Medical School alumni
Members of the National Academy of Medicine